Mischocyttarus santacruzi is a species of social wasp from the Vespidae family. It was first discovered in the Atlantic Forest from Ilhéus, Southern portion of Bahia State, Northeastern Brazil.

References

Vespidae
Hymenoptera of South America
Insects described in 2000